Ferro may refer to:

Iron, a ferromagnetic material
Ferro (architecture), a wrought-iron architectural element
Ferro Carril Oeste, an Argentinian football team
Ferro (Covilhã), a civil parish in the municipality of Covilhã, Portugal
Ferro meridian, an alternative prime meridian through El Hierro
Ferro Lad, comic book superhero
Ferro (footballer) (born 1997), Portuguese footballer 
Ferro (surname)